Lenax mirandus is a species of beetles in the family Monotomidae, the only extant species in the genus Lenax. It is endemic to New Zealand. This genus also includes extinct species Lenax karenae known from Cretaceous Burmese amber from Myanmar.

References

Monotomidae